The Bitumirim River is a river of Paraná state in southeastern Brazil. Rising in Ipiranga municipality, it flows eastwards to join the Tibagi River.

See also
List of rivers of Paraná

References

Rivers of Paraná (state)